Winnie the Pooh is a 2011 American animated adventure film produced by Walt Disney Animation Studios and released by Walt Disney Pictures. The 51st Disney animated feature film, it is based on the eponymous novel series written by A. A. Milne and illustrated by E. H. Shepard. The film is a revival of Disney's Winnie the Pooh franchise and the fifth theatrical Winnie the Pooh film released. It was directed by Stephen J. Anderson and Don Hall (in his feature directorial debut), produced by Peter Del Vecho and Clark Spencer, and narrated by John Cleese, with a story written by Anderson, Hall, Brian Kesinger, Clio Chiang, Don Dougherty, Kendelle Hoyer, Nicole Mitchell, and Jeremy Spears.

Jim Cummings reprises his voice roles as Winnie the Pooh and Tigger, and Travis Oates reprises his voice role as Piglet, while newcomers Tom Kenny, Craig Ferguson, Bud Luckey, and Kristen Anderson-Lopez provide the voices of Rabbit, Owl, Eeyore, and Kanga, respectively. In the film, the aforementioned residents of the Hundred Acre Wood embark on a quest to save Christopher Robin from an imaginary culprit while Pooh deals with a hunger for honey.

Production began in September 2008 with Walt Disney Animation Studios' chief creative officer John Lasseter announcing that Disney wanted to create a film that would "transcend generations". The film features six songs by Kristen Anderson-Lopez and Robert Lopez and a score composed by Henry Jackman, as well as a rendition of the Sherman Brothers' "Winnie the Pooh" theme song by actress and musician Zooey Deschanel.

Winnie The Pooh premiered at the Roy E. Disney Animation Building on the Walt Disney Studios lot in Burbank on July 10, 2011, and was released in the United States on July 15. It received largely positive reviews from critics who praised its nostalgic feeling but criticized its short runtime. However, the film underperformed at the box office, grossing $50 million worldwide on a $30 million budget. Though it is Disney's most recent traditionally animated theatrical film, producer Peter Del Vecho and Frozen directors Chris Buck and Jennifer Lee confirmed in 2019 that there would be possibilities for hand-drawn features in the future.

Plot
Christopher Robin and his animal friends live inside a storybook, whose text can be seen around many frames of the film. These letters are sometimes interacted with by the characters. 

Winnie the Pooh wakes up one day to find that he is out of honey ("The Tummy Song"). While out searching for more, Pooh discovers that Eeyore has lost his tail. Pooh, Piglet, Rabbit, Owl, Kanga and Roo come to the rescue ("A Very Important Thing To Do") while Tigger has his bouncing fun. Christopher Robin decides to hold a contest to see who can find a replacement for Eeyore's tail. The prize for the winner is a fresh pot of honey ("The Winner Song"). After everyone else's failed attempts to replace Eeyore's tail, Kanga suggests that they use a scarf. This is declared the winner, but it soon unravels.

Later on, Pooh still has not been able to find any honey. He goes to visit Christopher Robin, and finds a handwritten note reading "GoN OUT BIZY BACK SooN c.ʀ.", a misspelling of "Gone Out, Busy, Backson" with Christopher Robin's initials. Pooh is unable to read the note, so he asks for Owl's help. Owl's poor reading comprehension skills lead Pooh and his friends to believe that Christopher Robin has been abducted by a ruthless and mischievous creature they call the "Backson" ("The Backson Song"). Rabbit plans to trap the beast by leaving a trail of items leading to a pit. Meanwhile, Tigger, who wants a sidekick to help him defeat the Backson, recruits a reluctant Eeyore to be a second Tigger ("It's Gonna Be Great"). He dresses up like the Backson and tries to teach Eeyore how to fight. Eeyore manages to escape from Tigger and hides underwater, where he discovers an anchor.

After a failed attempt to get honey from a bee hive, Pooh's imagination and hunger get the better of him ("Everything is Honey"); he accidentally eats some mud, and falls into the trap meant for the Backson. Rabbit, Kanga, Roo, Owl, and Piglet use Eeyore's anchor "replacement tail" as a rope to try to get Pooh out, but its weight pulls everyone but Piglet into the pit. Piglet tries to help them out, but consistently over-interprets Rabbit's instructions, leading to the destruction of the only rope he has with him. He goes to find more rope, but runs into Tigger. Mistaking Tigger's training costume for the actual monster, Piglet uses a red balloon to fly away from Tigger, inadvertently knocking some of the storybook's letters into the pit.

After the chase, Tigger and Piglet fall into the trap as well. Eeyore reminds Tigger that he, being "the only one", is "the most wonderful thing about Tiggers." Eventually, Pooh figures out how to use the fallen letters to form a ladder, and his friends are able to escape the pit. Christopher Robin, returning from having gone to school, finds his friends, and explains his note's true meaning; Owl flies away, embarrassed. The honey pot prize is given to the red balloon from earlier, much to Pooh's dismay.

Later, Pooh visits Owl for honey, and discovers that Owl, not recognizing what it was, had found Eeyore's tail and was using it as a bell pull. Owl offers Pooh some honey for lunch, but Pooh, ignoring his tummy's loud rumbling, hurries to give Eeyore his tail back. Christopher Robin is proud of Pooh's selflessness; as a reward for his kindness, Pooh is given a pot of honey twice as tall as he is. ("Pooh's Finale") He and Christopher Robin walk off into the sunset together.

In a post-credits scene, a genuine Backson arrives, but is actually a very nice and gentle creature. He finds the trail of items left for him, including a drawing of himself; not recognizing himself, he calls it a "scary looking fella". Deciding to return the items to Christopher Robin, he starts picking them up, but ends up falling into the pit.

Cast

Jim Cummings as
Winnie the Pooh, a kind-hearted anthropomorphic bear who loves honey. Mark Henn served as the supervising animator for Pooh.
Tigger, a hyperactive and brave tiger. Andreas Deja served as the supervising animator for Tigger.
Bud Luckey as Eeyore, an old grey donkey who is often miserable and who loses his tail. Randy Haycock served as the supervising animator for Eeyore.
Craig Ferguson as Owl, an elderly owl who is not as wise as he thinks, and tells very long and boring stories about his family. Dale Baer served as the supervising animator for Owl.
Jack Boulter as Christopher Robin, a young human boy and one of Pooh's best friends. Henn also served as the supervising animator for Christopher Robin.
Travis Oates as Piglet, a small pig who's afraid of everything, and Pooh's best friend. Bruce W. Smith served as the supervising animator for Piglet. 
Tom Kenny as Rabbit, a rabbit who is pretentious and strait-laced. He loves planting vegetables in his garden. Eric Goldberg served as the supervising animator for Rabbit.
Kristen Anderson-Lopez as Kanga, a female kangaroo and Roo's mother. Smith also served as the supervising animator for Kanga. 
Wyatt Dean Hall as Roo, Kanga's excitable young kangaroo. Smith again served as the supervising animator for Roo. 
Huell Howser as Backson, the mysterious creature who was thought to kidnap Christopher Robin. Goldberg also served as the supervising animator for the Backson.
John Cleese as the Narrator

Production 
Walt Disney Animation Studios' chief creative officer John Lasseter first approached Stephen Anderson and Don Hall in November 2008 about making a new Winnie the Pooh film for theaters, with the two becoming enthusiastic at the idea and accepting the project. In 2009, Lasseter, Anderson and Hall viewed the classic Winnie the Pooh feature shorts and films to figure out how to make the title character culturally relevant.

Following a trip to Ashdown Forest in Sussex, South East England to explore the location of A. A. Milne's original stories, the filmmakers enlisted Burny Mattinson, a Disney veteran who worked as the key animator on the 1974 short Winnie the Pooh and Tigger Too, to serve as lead storyboard artist for the film, with Anderson and Hall directing. After seeing all the feature films about Winnie the Pooh, Mattinson thought he could use Milne's story "In which Eeyore loses his tail and Pooh finds one" as the basic idea for the plot. Mattinson's five-minute pitch for the sequence where Eeyore loses his tail is credited with convincing Disney executives to make the film a feature-length work instead of a featurette. Regarding the decision to use hand-drawn (traditional) animation in lieu of computer-generated imagery (CGI), Anderson stated that "If this were a fully CG-animated [sic] and rendered and lit Pooh, it just wouldn’t feel right. We would be doing the characters a real disservice." Many of the animation staff from The Princess and the Frog (2009) were brought in to work on Winnie the Pooh, as the two films involved traditional animation, and additional clean up/inbetween animation and digital ink and paint was provided by Yowza Animation, Inc. The production would also use the same software utilized for Princess and the Frog, Toon Boom Animation's Harmony, to digitally ink and paint the drawings.

Originally, the film was supposed to feature five stories from the A. A. Milne books, but the final cut ended up drawing inspiration from three stories. Lasseter had also announced that Rabbit's friends and relatives would be in the film, but their scene was ultimately deleted.

Release
The film was released on Wednesday, April 6, 2011 in Belgium; April 11 in Germany; and on April 15 in the United Kingdom. It was released on July 15, 2011, in the United States.

Short films
The film was preceded by the animated short The Ballad of Nessie, which tells the story of how the Loch Ness Monster and her best friend MacQuack (a rubber duck) came to live in the loch they now call home. In some international screenings, the episode "Cubby's Goldfish" from the Disney Junior series Jake and the Never Land Pirates was aired instead.

Home media
The film was first released as number 51 in the Animated Classics range on Blu-ray, DVD, and digital download on October 25, 2011. The releases included animated shorts The Ballad of Nessie and Mini Adventures of Winnie the Pooh: "Pooh's Balloon," as well as deleted scenes.

Reception

Critical response
The website's critics consensus reads: "Short, nostalgic, and gently whimsical, Winnie the Pooh offers young audiences—and their parents—a sweetly traditional family treat." Metacritic, which assigns a weighted average score out of 100 to reviews from mainstream critics, the film received an average score of 74 out of 100, based on 26 critics, "generally favorable reviews". CinemaScore polls reported that the average grade moviegoers gave the film an "A−" on an A+ to F scale.

Gary Goldstein of the Los Angeles Times says the film "proves a fitting tribute to one of the last century's most enduring children's tales." A. O. Scott of The New York Times praised the film for being able to charm children and parents alike. Roger Ebert, giving it 3 stars out of 4, wrote in his review, "In a time of shock-value 3-D animation and special effects, the look of the film is gentle and pleasing. It was hand-animated, I'm told, and the backgrounds use a subtle and reassuring watercolor style. It's a nightmare-proof experience for even the youngest viewers."

While Platform Online stated that Winnie the Poohs "hand-drawn animation is such a welcome relief," it found the film's run-time length to be more of an issue, which it stated "At just 70 minutes, even aiming at kids this could have been longer – Pixar have been pushing films well over 90 minutes for years now, and it's clear the children can handle it. Just as you really get into the film it's over, and you're left wanting more."

Box office
In North America, Winnie the Pooh earned $7.8 million in its opening weekend from 2,405 single-screen locations, averaging about $3,267 per venue, and ranking sixth for the weekend. The film closed on September 22, 2011, with a final domestic gross of $26.7 million, with the opening weekend making up 29.44% of the final gross. Among its overseas grosses, Winnie the Pooh had its largest gross in Japan with $4.13 million; the country has had a long-standing affection for the character of Winnie the Pooh. Other international grosses include $1.33 million in Germany, $1.29 million in Poland, $1.18 million in the UK and $1.14 million in Russia. Overall, it made $23.4 million overseas, bringing the worldwide gross to $50.1 million over a budget of $30 million.

Accolades

Soundtrack

In order to search for song-writers, Anderson and Hall sent visuals to five songwriting teams, and the team liked the demos returned by Robert Lopez and Kristen Anderson-Lopez, eventually backing them on board. The Lopezes' previously worked with John Lasseter and Disney music executive Chris Montan on the theme park musical version of Finding Nemo. They wrote seven tracks for Winnie the Pooh. Zooey Deschanel performed three songs for the film, including a take on the Winnie the Pooh theme song, "A Very Important Thing to Do" and an original end-credit song "So Long", which was written by Deschanel and performed with She & Him bandmate M. Ward. The film was scored by Henry Jackman, with additional music by Christopher Willis. The soundtrack was released on July 12, 2011.

Other versions
The Walt Disney Company released five versions for the song "Welcome to my world" featuring Edyta Bartosiewicz for the Polish version, Witaj w moim świecie (Welcome to my world), Anca Sigartău for the Romanian version, Bun Venit în Lumea mea (Welcome to My World), Zséda for the Hungarian version, Az én világom (My world), Evgenia Vlasova for the Ukrainian version, Мій світ (My world), and Beloslava for the Bulgarian version, Добре дошъл в моя свят (Dobre doshŭl v moya svyat).

Stage adaptation
A musical theatre adaptation, titled Disney's Winnie the Pooh KIDS, uses additional music from Will Van Dyke and additional lyrics and scenes by Cheryl Davies.

Notes

References

External links

Winnie the Pooh at Walt Disney Animation Studios

2011 films
2010s English-language films
2011 animated films
2011 directorial debut films
2010s American animated films
2010s fantasy comedy films
2010s musical comedy films
2010s children's animated films
2010s buddy comedy films
American children's animated comedy films
American children's animated fantasy films
American films with live action and animation
American children's animated musical films
American fantasy comedy films
American musical comedy films
Animated buddy films
Animated films about friendship
American animated feature films
Annie Award winners
Films set in 1928
Films set in England
Winnie-the-Pooh films
Walt Disney Animation Studios films
Walt Disney Pictures animated films
Films directed by Stephen J. Anderson
Films directed by Don Hall
Films produced by Peter Del Vecho
Films produced by Clark Spencer
Films scored by Henry Jackman
2011 comedy films